Nimule is a city in the southern part of South Sudan in Magwi County, Eastern Equatoria.

Overview and history
In 1901, Nimule was the base for a British punitive expedition against the Lango, which had raided neighbouring districts. The Longo had been supported by Sudanese mutineers, who were all captured or killed by the British force.

On 19 August 2013, the South Sudanese parliament decided to upgrade Nimule Town to City Council status, administered by a City Clerk. Some in the county have protested, calling for wider consultations.

On April 7, 2014, the Mountain Trade and Development Bank expanded into the Eastern Equatoria state by opening a new branch in the town of Nimule.

On October 6, 2017; Uganda had pledged to supply power to two South Sudanese border towns as part of the Eastern Africa Power Pool agreement; that calls on all member states to connect electricity to each other. Uganda's energy minister Simon D'Ujanga said "400 kilo-volts of power will be supplied to the towns of Kaya and Nimule to boost socio-economic activities in the border areas.

Population
The population of Nimule was estimated at about 45,000 in 2006. The current population is not publicly known, as of December 2014.

One stop border post
In February 2020, the one stop border post (OSBP) on the  Nimule side of the  border was officially opened for business. The OSBP was built at a cost of US$5 million with financing from Trademark East Africa. The OSBP on the Ugandan side at Elegu was completed earlier and was commissioned in November 2018. During the calendar year ending December 2019, South Sudan imported goods worth US$364 million from Uganda.

Economy
Commercial bank branches:
 A branch of Equity Bank South Sudan Limited
 A branch of Kenya Commercial Bank South Sudan Limited
 A branch of Mountain Trade and Development Bank

Transportion and infrastructure
Juba-Nimule Road - 119 mile road, that connects Juba to Numule SS Highway A43.
Gulu–Nimule Road - 65 mile road, that connects Highway A104 in Uganda with South Sudan Highway A43.
Nimule Airport -  The airport,  has a single unpaved runway which measures  in length.
Nimule National Park - The national park is located just outside town, to the north and to the east.

Proposed improvements
Rail Extension - In 2007, there were new proposals for a standard gauge rail link between Uganda and South Sudan passing through Nimule.

Accidents
 On 7 October 2006, a heavy truck with Ugandan registration UAD 720U from Uganda, carrying cement caused several spans on one of the two carriageways of the bridge to collapse into the river.
A joint investigation by the South Sudanese and Ugandan authorities, cited (a) overloading (b) speeding and (c) driver fatigue as factors in the collision.
 On Monday, 29 September 2014, a passenger bus traveling from Juba, crashed head-on with a truck-trailer carrying merchandise from Uganda to Juba. The accident which occurred at about 7.00 AM, killed at about 60 people and injured 13 others. Eyewitnesses stated that the truck was traveling on the wrong side of the road.

Points of interest
The following points of interest are located in or near Nimule:

 The offices of Nimule Town Council
 Cornerstone Children's Home, Cornerstone Academy and Cornerstone Clinic - Programs run by Fulaa Lifeline International, a non-profit NGO.
 Merlin Hospital Nimule - A private, non-profit hospital, owned and operated by Medical Emergency Relief International (Merlin), an NGO
 Nimule Airport - A public, civilian and military airport
 The International border between South Sudan and the Republic of Uganda
 The Gulu-Juba Highway - , the  highway is murram. Arrangements to convert the highway to bitumen surface are underway in both countries.
 Nimule National Park - The national park is located just outside town, to the north and to the east.
 The Leadership Academy of South Sudan (LASS) is located on the eastern outskirts of Nimule town.

See also
 Railway stations in South Sudan
 Transport in South Sudan

References

External links
  Website of Nimule Standard Newspaper

Populated places in Eastern Equatoria
South Sudan–Uganda border crossings